Lyneham may refer to:

 Lyneham, Australian Capital Territory, a suburb of Canberra, Australia
 Lyneham High School
 Lyneham, Oxfordshire, a village and civil parish in England
 Lyneham, Wiltshire, a village in England
 RAF Lyneham, former Royal Air Force base
 Lyneham, Yealmpton, an historic estate in Devon, England